Francesco Farioli (born 10 April 1989) is an Italian professional football manager who was most recently head coach of Turkish Super League club Alanyaspor.

Career
Farioli studied philosophy and later sports science in university. He began his career in football as a goalkeepers coach with Margine Coperta from 2009 to 2011. He thereafter was the goalkeepers coach at Fortis Juventus, and Lucchese, before moving to Qatar with the Aspire Academy, the Qatar U16s. He was approached by Roberto De Zerbi to return to Italy, and there was the goalkeeper coach with Benevento in the 2017–18 season. He followed De Zerbi at Sassuolo from 2018 to 2020.

He had his first stint as an assistant manager with the Turkish Super League club Alanyaspor for the 2020–21 season, where the team had an impressive start that saw them close to the top of the league. On 21 March 2021, he was appointed the head coach of Fatih Karagümrük which is another Turkish Super League club. At 31 years, he was the youngest football manager in a pro league in Europe at the time of his contract signing. He left Fatih Karagümrük on 12 December 2021.

On 31 December 2021 he joined his former club Alanyaspor once again but this time as a manager.

Career statistics

References

External links
 
 Official website

1989 births
Living people
Sportspeople from the Province of Lucca
Italian football managers
Italian expatriate football managers
Fatih Karagümrük S.K. managers
Süper Lig managers
Italian expatriate sportspeople in Qatar
Italian expatriate sportspeople in Turkey
Expatriate football managers in Qatar
Expatriate football managers in Turkey
People from Barga, Tuscany